Finnemore E. Morton (January 21, 1832 – January 26, 1899) was a Canadian politician. He served in the Legislative Assembly of New Brunswick from 1879 to 1886 as an independent member. He served as Solicitor General in 1882. Morton was a lawyer, having been called to the bar in 1875 and appointed Queen's Counsel in 1882.

References 

1832 births
1899 deaths